Marionetas en la cuerda – Sandie Shaw canta en Español is a Spanish-language album by the British singer Sandie Shaw. It is a compilation of her recordings in this language, featuring Spanish versions of many of her hits.

Track listing

 "No vendrá" - ("Girl Don't Come")
 "Ante nada me detendré" - ("I'll Stop at Nothing")
 "¡Viva el amor!" - ("Long Live Love")
 "No lo comprendí" - ("Message Understood")
 "No me quieres más" - ("You Don't Want Me No More")
 "No necesito tu amor" - ("I Don't Need That Kind of Lovin'")
 "Mañana" - ("Tomorrow")
 "Lo conseguí" - ("Nothing Comes Easy")
 "Marionetas en la cuerda" - ("Puppet on a String")
 "A los chicos les dirás" - ("Tell the Boys")
 "Otra vez soñé" - ("Had a Dream Last Night")
 "Dile a cualquiera" - ("Ask Any Woman")
 "Esta noche en Tokyo" - ("Tonight in Tokyo")
 "La has vuelto a ver" - ("You've Been Seeing Her Again")
 "No has cambiado nada" - ("You've Not Changed")
 "Londres" - ("London")
 "Así, así" - ("That's Why")
 "Parale" - ("Hold Him Down")
 "Qué tiempo tan feliz" - ("Those Were the Days")
 "Ojos gitanos" - ("Gypsy Eyes")
 "Monsieur Dupont"
 "Dejate ya" - ("Think It All Over")
 "Qué  me hará" - ("Che effetto mi fa")
 "Un mañana" - ("By Tomorrow")
 "El poder y la gloria" - ("Show Your Face")

Sandie Shaw albums
2004 compilation albums
EMI Records compilation albums
Spanish-language compilation albums